"Like a Lady" is a song by American country music group Lady A. It is the lead single to their ninth studio album What a Song Can Do. Group member Hillary Scott co-wrote the song with Dave Barnes, Michelle Buzz, Martin Johnson, and Brandon Paddock, the last two of whom co-produced with Dann Huff.

Content
Group member Hillary Scott co-wrote the song with Dave Barnes, Michelle Buzz, Martin Johnson, and Brandon Paddock. Scott described the song as being inspired by Dolly Parton's "9 to 5" and Shania Twain's "Man! I Feel Like a Woman!" in terms of being an up-tempo anthem with a theme of female empowerment. The song features Scott on lead vocals, with Charles Kelley and Dave Haywood providing vocal harmony and guitar work. Ilya Toshinsky performs banjo and mandolin on the song, and Stuart Duncan plays fiddle.

Critical reception
Angela Stefano of Taste of Country wrote that the song was "a big ol' slice of girl power". Writing for the same site, Cillea Hougton stated that "The summery track ditches the polite standards associated with the phrase the song is named after, instead following a single woman for a night on the town where she treats herself to the highest liquor on the shelf and dances like no one’s watching." CMT writer Jessica Nicholson called the song's guitar work "'80s inspired". Kevin John Coyne of Country Universe was less favorable toward the track, calling it a "assembled from spare parts and assembled on the backs of other women who have done the work." He also criticized the band for "build[ing] an entire song around the name [they] have stolen from a black woman".

Charts

Weekly charts

Year-end charts

Certifications

References

2021 singles
2021 songs
Lady A songs
Songs written by Dave Barnes
Songs written by Martin Johnson (musician)
Songs written by Hillary Scott
Song recordings produced by Dann Huff
Big Machine Records singles